BackCourt: Wade is an American reality series that premiered on November 20, 2017 on Facebook Watch. It follows NBA basketball player Dwyane Wade and how he spends his time off-the-court.

Premise
BackCourt: Wade follows "the three-time NBA champ as he travels to Paris and Milan for Men’s Fashion Week and takes up new hobbies (like golf and taking care of his new dog, Tre). Other episodes cover his mindset going into his 15th season in the NBA and provide an inside look at his business ventures, including his Way of Wade brand and Wade Wine labels."

Production

Development
On November 17, 2017, it was announced that Facebook Watch had ordered a first season of BackCourt: Wade, a new reality series starring basketball player Dwyane Wade. Executive producers include Wade, Dwyane Wade and Lisa Joseph Metelus and producers include Arlesha Amazan, Bob Metelus, and Edward Burke. Production companies involved with the series include Bob Metelus Studio.

The series premiered on November 20, 2017.

Marketing
Simultaneously with the initial series announcement, Facebook released a trailer for the first season of the show.

Episodes

See also
 List of original programs distributed by Facebook Watch

References

External links
 

Facebook Watch original programming
2010s American reality television series
2017 American television series debuts
2017 American television series endings
English-language television shows
American non-fiction web series